The Polystomellaceae are a family of fungi with an uncertain taxonomic placement in the class Dothideomycetes.

GBIF lists the following accepted genera;
 Coscinopeltis (1)
 Dermatodothella  (1)
 Dothidella  (36)
 Dothithyriella  (1)
 Marchalia  (1)
 Munkiella  (1)
 Parastigmatea  (7)
 Pluriporus  (1)
 Polystomella  (6)
Note: Figures in brackets = how many species per genus

References 
 
Roniv

External links 
 Index Fungorum

Dothideomycetes enigmatic taxa
Ascomycota families